Ireland is a surname. Notable people with the surname include:
Alexander Ireland (disambiguation)
Alexander Ireland (journalist) (1810–1894), Scottish journalist
Alexander Ireland (boxer) (1901–1966), British boxer
Alleyne Ireland (1871–1951), British traveller and author
Andrew Ireland (disambiguation)
Andy Ireland (born 1930), American politician
Andrew Ireland (footballer) (born 1953), Australian rules footballer and administrator
Andrew Ireland (rower) (born 1982), Canadian rower
Ann Ireland (1953–2018), Canadian fiction author
Anne Ireland (disambiguation)
Anne Ireland (1842–1893), English writer and biographer
Anne Ireland (volleyball) (born 1946), Canadian volleyball player
Anthony Ireland (disambiguation)
Anthony Ireland (actor) (1902–1957), British actor
Anthony Ireland (basketball) (born 1989), American basketball player
Anthony Ireland (cricketer) (born 1984), Zimbabwean cricketer
Bernard Ireland (????–2019), British naval engineer and writer
Betty Ireland (born 1946), American politician
Betty de Courcy Ireland (1911–1999), Irish socialist and anti-war activist
Brian Ireland (born 1980), American drummer
Brian de Courcy-Ireland (1900–2001), British naval officer
Celia Ireland (born 1966), Australian actress
Charles Thomas Ireland Jr. (1921–1972), American businessman
Chris Ireland (born 1951), American pharmacist and professor
Christopher Ireland (born ????), American brigadier general
Clifford C. Ireland (1878–1930), American politician
Colin Ireland (1954–2012), British serial killer
Courtney Ireland (born ????), New Zealander athlete
Craig Ireland (born 1975), Scottish footballer
Daniel Ireland (disambiguation)
Daniel Frederick Ireland (1949–2016), American-Canadian film producer and director
Daniel Anthony Ireland (born 1990), Australian football player
Darwin Ireland (born 1971), American football player
David Ireland (disambiguation)
David Ireland (artist) (1930–2009), American artist
David Ireland (author) (born 1927), Australian novelist
David Ireland (colonel) (1832–1864), American soldier
David Ireland (playwright) (born 1976), Northern Irish-born playwright and actor
De Courcy Ireland (1873–1915), Irish cricketer and British Indian Army officer
Denis Ireland (1894–1974), Irish essayist and political activist
Dennis Ireland (born 1954), New Zealander motorcycle racer
Doug Ireland (born 1946), American journalist
Eleanor Ireland (born 1926), British computer scientist
Faith Ireland (born 1942), American judge
Gail L. Ireland (1895–1988), American attorney and politician
Gary Ireland (born 1961), Australian cricketer
George Ireland (disambiguation)
George Ireland (businessman) (1801–1879), British businessman
George Ireland (MP) (died 1596), English politician
George Ireland (New Zealand politician) (1829–1880), New Zealander politician
George Ireland (1913–2001), American basketball coach
Gilbert Ireland (1624–1675), English politician
Greg Ireland (born 1965), Canadian ice hockey coach
Innes Ireland (1930–1993), Scottish race car driver
Jake Ireland (born 1946), Canadian football referee
James Ireland (disambiguation)
James Ireland (1846–1886), Scottish architect
James Ireland (musician) (born ????), Australian drummer
Janna Ireland (born 1985), African-American photographer
Jeff Ireland (born 1970), American football administrator
Jerry Ireland (1938–2020), English footballer
Jill Ireland (1936–1990), English actress
Jimmie Ireland (1903–1998), Scottish rugby union player
John Ireland (1914–1992), Canadian-American actor and film director
John Ireland (disambiguation)
John Ireland (theologian) (fl. 1459–1495), Scottish theologian, diplomat, and priest
John Ireland (pirate) (1694–1701), American pirate
John Ireland (writer), (died 1808), British author
John Ireland (Anglican priest) (1761–1842), English Anglican priest and philanthropist
John Busteed Ireland (1823–1913), American lawyer, writer, and landowner
John Ireland (politician) (1827–1896), American politician
John Ireland (archbishop) (1838–1918), American religious leader and academic
John Ireland (composer) (1879–1962), English composer
John Ireland (philatelist) (1882–1965), British philatelist
John Ireland (cricketer) (1888–1970), English amateur cricketer
John de Courcy Ireland (1911–2006), Irish historian and activist
John Ireland (1914–1992), Canadian-American actor and film director
John Ireland (South African musician) (born 1954), South African pop musician
John Ireland (sportscaster) (born 1963), American sportscaster
Jon Ireland (born 1967), Australian tennis player
Jordie Ireland (born 1997), Australian musician and producer
Justina Ireland (born ????), American author
Karin Ireland (born ????), American author
Kathy Ireland (born 1963), American model, actress, author, and entrepreneur
Kenny Ireland (1944–2014), Scottish director and actor
Kevin Ireland (born 1933), New Zealander poet
Kylie Ireland (born 1970), American pornographic actress and radio show host
Kym Ireland (born 1955), Australian field hockey player
Lynwood Ireland (born 1942), American politician
Mardy S. Ireland (born ????), American author and psychoanalyst
Margaret Ann Ireland (1928–2018), Canadian pianist and radio producer and broadcaster
Marin Ireland (born 1979), American actress
Mark Ireland (disambiguation)
Mark Ireland (artist) (born 1960), Australian artist, musician and filmmaker
Mark Ireland (priest) (born 1960), British Archdeacon of Blackburn
Mary E. Ireland (1934–1927), American author and translator
Merritte W. Ireland (1867–1952), Surgeon General of the United States Army
Mike Ireland (born 1974), Canadian speed skater
Patricia Ireland (born 1945), American feminist and administrator
Paul Ireland (born 1970), Scottish actor
R. Duane Ireland (born ???), American professor and author
Richard Ireland (disambiguation)
Richard Davies Ireland (1816–1877), Australian politician
Richard Ireland (rower) (born ????), English rower
Robert Ireland (disambiguation)
Robert Ireland (died 1599) (1532–1599), English politician
Robert Livingston Ireland Jr. (1895–1981), American businessman
Robert Ireland (footballer, born 1900), Scottish footballer
Robert McGregor Innes Ireland (1930–1993), British military officer
Robert Ireland (Australian footballer) (born 1948), Australian rules footballer
Roderick L. Ireland (born 1944), American judge
Samuel Ireland (1744–1800), British author
Sean Ireland (born 1969), Canadian speed skater
Sidney Ireland (1886–1964), English footballer
Simon Ireland (born 1971), English footballer
Stephen Ireland (born 1986), Irish footballer
Thomas James Ireland (1792–1863), British politician
Tim Ireland (born 1953), American baseball player
Walter Ireland (disambiguation)
Walter Ireland (tennis) (1882–1932), Romanian tennis player
Walter Ireland (1923–2010), American politician
William Ireland (disambiguation)
William Ireland (Jesuit) (1636–1679), English Jesuit and martyr falsely accused of conspiring to murder King Charles II
William Henry Ireland (1775–1835), English forger of Shakespearean documents and plays
William M. Ireland (died 1891), One of the founders of the National Grange of the Order of Patrons of Husbandry
William Addison Ireland (1880–1935), American cartoonist
William Ireland (tennis) (1882–1932), Romanian tennis player
William Henry Ireland (politician) (1883–1962), Canadian merchant and political figure
Willis "Bill" Ireland (1927–2007), American college football and baseball coach

Ireland is also used as a forename, like in:
Ireland Baldwin (born 1995), American actress and model
Ireland Thomas (1875–1955), American stage performer, newspaper columnist, and theater manager

Ireland is also used as a middle name, like in:

James Ireland Cash, Jr. (born 1947), American business academic
James Ireland Craig (1868–1952), Scottish mathematician and meteorologist
John Ireland Blackburne (1783–1874), British politician, father of the man born 1817
John Ireland Blackburne (1817–1893), British army officer and politician, son of the man born 1783
John Ireland Howe (1793–1876), American inventor
John Ireland Falconer (1879–1954), Scottish lord provost